Leonhard Kukk (12 August 1906 – 1944) was an Estonian weightlifter. He competed in the men's middleweight event at the 1928 Summer Olympics. Kukk was a civilian who was shot dead by Soviet soldiers during World War II.

References

1906 births
1944 deaths
Estonian male weightlifters
Olympic weightlifters of Estonia
Weightlifters at the 1928 Summer Olympics
People from Kambja Parish
Deaths by firearm in Estonia
Civilians killed in World War II
Estonian people executed by the Soviet Union